Itamar Freed is an Israeli artist.

Biography 
Itamar Freed was born in 1987 in Manhattan. Itamar Freed graduated with BFA from the Bezalel Academy of Arts and Design in 2012. He is studying for MFA in Photography at the Royal College of Arts in London. Freed is dividing his time between Israel and London.

Exhibitions

Solo 
 2014. Birds of Paradise. Feinberg Projects. Tel Aviv.
 2015. No time, Ramat Gan Museum of Israeli Art. Curated by Ayelet Hashahar Cohen.

Group 
2016. Musrara Mix, Musrara gallery, Naggar School of Photography, Jerusalem
2017. A Private Moment in Public, Haifa Museum of Art. Curated by Limor Alpern Zered.

Awards 

2012. Epson first prize for excellence in the art of photography. Israel

References 

Israeli photographers
Bezalel Academy of Arts and Design alumni
1987 births
Living people